is a Japanese original video animation (OVA) series. It is an adaptation of the historical fantasy novel Teito Monogatari by Hiroshi Aramata. The anime is darker in tone, more violent, and more sexually explicit than any previous adaptations of the novel; an artistic decision likely inspired by the financial success of the OVA Urotsukidōji: Legend of the Overfiend. Like its live-action predecessor, Tokyo: The Last Megalopolis, the anime is only an adaptation of the first third (the first four books) of the original novel.

It was released by Toei in 1991. Manga Entertainment first licensed the property for English release subbed and dubbed in 1993. In 1995, Streamline Pictures gained the rights to the anime and released it on a four-volume cassette series in the US, with their own separate English dub. In 2001, ADV Films re-released the entire series on a 2-Disc DVD edition. However, this release did not have the original Japanese soundtrack or any special features. Eventually, ADV gathered the rights to the original Japanese voices, and in 2003 re-released an enhanced version titled Doomed Megalopolis: Special Edition, wherein the Japanese language option was available and bonus features (such as interviews and documentaries) were added.

Plot
The plot concerns a spiritual battle within Tokyo during the early 20th century.

Episode 1: "The Haunting of Tokyo"
The story begins in contemporary Tokyo, with a voiceover narrative concerning the expanding city’s state.<ref>Narrator:''' Tokyo...continuously expanding as one of the biggest megalopolises in the world. It hates darkness and seeks out light. The city which keeps working for 24 hours without any rest, Tokyo...(Doomed Megalopolis) Toei Animation Studio, Translated by ADV, 2003</ref> The narrator tells the tale of how Taira no Masakado went against the Emperor and was executed for his crimes. However, his hatred for the new capital of Edo has left a dangerous onryo that persists in the city to this day.<ref>Narrator:' In the Heian Era, there was a hero who tried to build a utopia in the Kanto Area and rose up against the Imperial Court. Taira no Masakado. People say his regretful and angry soul has remained in this place as a vengeful spirit. (Doomed Megalopolis) Toei Animation Studio, Translated by ADV, 2003</ref> Throughout the years, Masakado's spirit was placated through the worship of the citizens of Tokyo, and he became deified as the city's guardian spirit. If his powerful spirit were to be awoken and/or disturbed, though, his suppressed anger against the Japanese Empire would be unleashed and would cause havoc on a national level.

The setting moves backward to 1908. Two figures appear in Tokyo at exactly the same time. One is Yasumasa Hirai, a master onmyoji, a direct descendant of Abe no Seimei and leader of the Tsuchimikado Family; who has come to give advice to Baron Eiichi Shibusawa on how to make Tokyo the most blessed and successful city in the East. The other figure is Yasunori Kato, an evil Onmyoji who wishes to destroy Tokyo completely to appease his ancestors, the indigenous tribes of Japan who fought against the Imperial court in ancient times.Yasumasa Hirai: There is no Kato family in Ryujin Village. There is no Kato in the ancient documents. However, this village is close to the place where ascetics have trained, and there were many rumors in that village about strangers who sometimes appeared in the nearby mountains and used magic. I believe Kato is the descendent of the ancient people who never obeyed the founder, and he inherited both the curse and the magic of the Kibi. (Doomed Megalopolis) Toei Animation Studio, Translated by ADV, 2003 Kato plans to do this by awakening the raging spirit of Taira no Masakado as a weapon to demolish the city. To do this, he kidnaps a young woman (Yukari Tatsumiya), who is blessed with psychic powers, to use as a medium for Masakado's spirit. Hirai discovers this and attempts to stop Kato and save Yukari with his own magic. Hirai takes Yukari to the Tsuchimikado temple to perform the monoimi ceremony (recreating the events of one of Abe no Seimei's famous tales from the Uji Shūi Monogatari). In the meantime, Yukari's friends fight Kato's shikigami outside the temple so Hirai can complete the ceremony. But Kato still infiltrates Hirai's protective circle with a magical intruder, stopping the ceremony. In a final act of desperation Hirai grabs a sacred hamaya and fires it at Kato; but Kato magically reflects it back, mortally injuring Hirai. With Hirai defeated, Kato escapes with Yukari.

Episode 2: "The Fall of Tokyo"
Kato's attempts to awaken Masakado through Yukari have been unsuccessful so far, indicating that there may be other factors preventing Masakado from coming back to life. In response, Kato uses the magic of En on Yukari to impregnate her with the determination to conceive a child with even more spiritual power. Believing his magic has succeeded, Kato leaves Tokyo, planning to return when the child is of suitable age to use as a medium. Hirai's followers find Yukari and deliver her back to her brother's home. Tragedy strikes the nation as the Emperor Meiji passes away thus ending the Meiji period. In a display of devotion to the Meiji Emperor Hirai commits seppuku, an act which also serves to divine the year of Tokyo's destruction—the year of the Pig.

The story then moves ten years forward to 1923 where Yukari's daughter, Yukiko Tatsumiya, is now a young girl. In Dalian, China Kato creates artificial earthquake waves which will be amplified out to Tokyo. Then he returns to Japan to kidnap Yukiko. Upon crossing Nihonbashi Bridge, Kato runs into several defense measures set by Tsuchimikado Clan, including a Kimon Tonkou spell set by Hirai's follower and Koda Rohan. Despite all this resistance, he still successfully makes his way to Masakado's grave and tries to invoke its spirit through the body of Yukiko. Furious, Masakado's spirit reacts by summoning a lightning bolt down upon Kato. However Kato's previous attempts to create an artificial earthquake were successful to disturb the Underground Dragon, whose violent undulations result in the Great Kantō earthquake of 1923.

Episode 3: "The Gods of Tokyo"
The plot shifts to 1927, a year in the Showa Period. While rebuilding Tokyo, plans are put forth by Noritsugu Hayakawa to erect a subway system which will modernize the city. Hayakawa employs the talents of Torahiko Terada, a physicist and scientist in the field of earthquake studies, to oversee construction. Kato infiltrates the construction sites for the subway tunnel, and utilizes shikigami to hold the workers at bay while he focuses on a second awakening of the Underground Dragon, trying to create an earthquake larger than the Great Kanto one. Shibusawa calls in a Feng Shui expert (Shigemaru Kuroda), who pinpoints the source of these disturbances to foreign magic that is undermining the balance of the earth's spiritual energy veins. Since the construction workers are too frightened to continue their work, Terada decides that different action must be taken to complete the excavation. He enlists the help of Dr. Makoto Nishimura to use his robot Gakutensoku to finish the work. Terada reasons that since Gakutensoku is inhuman, he can't be tricked by psychic apparitions that would terrify normal men.

Meanwhile, a young shrine maiden by the name of Keiko Mekata appears near the Ministry of Finance. She is a powerful and skilled miko who has been summoned by Masakado's spirit to oppose Kato. While praying at Masakado's shrine one day, she catches the eye of Yoichiro Tatsumiya, who courts her. The two eventually marry, and Keiko is initiated into the Tatsumiya household. As a member of the Tatsumiya household, Keiko provides spiritual protection for the family from the inside. Kato, prevented from rousing the Underground Dragon by Masakado, decides to kidnap Yukiko and use her as a sacrifice to amplify the Dragon's energy. After a battle at the Tatsumiya household, Kato escapes with Yukiko and Keiko pursues him underground. While contending with Keiko, Kato is distracted and doesn't notice the efforts of Gakutensoku, who drilling deep underground, has arrived at the "heart" of the Underground Dragon and self-destructs. This throws the chi veins into disarray, releasing Yukiko and foiling Kato's plan. Finally, Keiko uses Masakado's power to banish Kato.

Episode 4: "The Battle for Tokyo"
Wounded by Keiko, Kato has retreated to a small, desecrated temple on the outskirts of Tokyo. The dark onmyoji employs all his powers to shift the path of the moon so that it will rebound violently off the earth and disturb the Firmament Dragon, who will destroy Tokyo. Keiko receives spiritual aid from Kuroda and Masakado's spirit and sets off to stop Kato once and for all. Instead of fighting him however, she channels the power of the bodhisattva Kannon, against whom Kato, an oni, is powerless. Bathed in the limitless compassion of the bodhisattva, the curse that had been fueling Kato for so long is appeased and he dissipates. The story ends in 1927 with Japan's first underground railroad system being opened and a quote by Koda Rohan, who hopes Tokyo will find peace for the time being.

Cast

Much of Manga Entertainment's cast is uncredited, while Streamline Pictures doesn't match actors to any roles. Both English cast lists have been made by comparing other roles in their talent pool with roles in the OVA series.

Production
Supervising director Rintaro had previously read Teito Monogatari upon its initial publication and was greatly attracted to it. In directing the animated adaptation, he felt that his biggest challenge would be distinguishing it from the recent popular live action adaptations Tokyo: The Last Megalopolis and Tokyo: The Last War''. He eventually decided that he would use the freedom given to him by animation to exploit the supernatural elements of the story, presenting them in a far more illustrious fashion than was possible with the live-action films. Although he tried to create his own unique vision, he admitted that the anime is still undeniably influenced by the live-action adaptations.

Actor Kyusaku Shimada was recruited to provide the voice of Yasunori Kato based on the popularity of his performance in the previous adaptations. This was his first time doing voice-over work for an animated production.

Distribution
As of 2010, the production is currently owned by Bandai and is available for streaming on their website.

References

External links

1991 anime OVAs
ADV Films
Madhouse (company)

ja:帝都物語#OVA版